Soruco is a surname. Notable people with the surname include:

Ámbar Soruco (born 1996), Chilean footballer 
Modesto Soruco (born 1966), Bolivian footballer
José Ramiro Suárez Soruco (born 1939), Bolivian businessman
Nilo Soruco (1927–2004), Bolivian singer-songwriter